Bogard may refer to:


People
 Ben M. Bogard (1868–1951), an American Baptist clergyman, author, editor, educator, radio broadcaster, and champion debater
 Delia Bogard (1921–1995), an American film actress and dancer
 Dick Bogard (1937–2003), minor league baseball player, manager and scout
 Jan Bogard (died c. 1634), Flemish printer in Leuven and Douai 
 Paul Bogard, American author and dark sky advocate

Video game characters
 Terry Bogard, a video game character in the Fatal Fury series and one of the DLC characters in Super Smash Bros. Ultimate
 Andy Bogard and Jeff Bogard, characters in the video game series Fatal Fury

Places
 Bogard, Missouri, a city in Carroll County, Missouri, United States
 Bogard Creek, a stream in Henry and Johnson counties, Missouri
 Bogard Township (disambiguation)

See also
 
 Bogarde